Uken Games is an independent game studio based in Toronto, Ontario, Canada.  The company was founded in 2009 by Chris Ye and Mark Lampert to build cross platform social and mobile games for iOS and Android.  In 2011, the company was the recipient of the Digi Award for Canada’s Most Promising New Digital Company.  Uken was in the top 10 of Deloitte's Fast 50 and #13 in their Fast 500 for 2014, after being one of Deloitte's "Companies-to-Watch" in 2013. Uken was certified as a Great Place to Work   and was recognized as one of Canada's Top Small & Medium Employers in 2017. Uken partnered with Sony to develop Jeopardy! World Tour which was released in May 2017. Subsequently in March 2018, Uken also developed and released a second trivia title Who Wants To Be A Millionaire? which became the top trivia game on mobile. In 2020, Uken released Ava’s Manor, a solitaire game where users renovate and decorate the manor while discovering mysterious clues and dabbling in a romantic love story. 

The studio also hosts numerous developer events including meetups for the Toronto Unity Developers, ReactJS, PhoneGap Toronto, DevOps Toronto, AngularJS Toronto and Go TO. Uken regularly sponsors TOJam (Toronto Game Jam) and Level Up Showcase. They hosted MolyJam’s Toronto chapter in 2012 and 2013, and were a sponsor of Gamercamp 2013 and the UTGDDC Game Jam.

Uken participates in various fundraising efforts for organizations such as the Movember Foundation, Canadian Breast Cancer Foundation, Canadian Red Cross disaster relief, American Red Cross disaster relief, Free the Children, Sunnybrook Cancer Research, Extra Life Marathon for Sick Kids, Camp Oochigeas (Sporting Life 10K) and Daily Bread Food Bank. Since the beginning of 2011, Uken’s charitable contributions total over $215,000

Current Titles

Past Titles

References

External links 
 Uken Games on App Annie
 As game market gets crowded, Toronto's Uken may have found the sweet spot
 Inside one of Toronto's fastest-growing gaming companies
 Uken Games raises $12,000 for the Canadian Breast Cancer Foundation
 Two Canadian Gaming Studios Raise $180,000 for Philippines Disaster Relief
 Canadian Gaming Startups Raise $180K for Typhoon Haiyan Relief
 Uken Games lets customers choose its charitable causes
 How to Stay Hyper-Competitive: Secrets from Uken Games
 A Canadian entrepreneur in New York: tapping global markets with government help
 Canadian students show off their games at Level Up 2013
 The Genesis of a Gaming Studio
 CCBC prepares project focused on educational games

2009 establishments in Ontario
Companies based in Toronto
Canadian companies established in 2009
Video game companies established in 2009
Video game companies of Canada
Video game development companies
Privately held companies of Canada